In Greek mythology, the name Lycaste (Ancient Greek: Λυκάστη) may refer to:

Lycaste, a Maenad in the retinue of Dionysus.
Lycaste, a follower of Artemis.
Lycaste of Lemnos, who slew her twin brother Cydimus the night all men on Lemnos were massacred by their women, and was glimpsed by Hypsipyle standing over his dead body overcome with remorse.
Lycaste, mother of Eryx by Butes.

Notes

References 

 Nonnus of Panopolis, Dionysiaca translated by William Henry Denham Rouse (1863-1950), from the Loeb Classical Library, Cambridge, MA, Harvard University Press, 1940.  Online version at the Topos Text Project.
 Nonnus of Panopolis, Dionysiaca. 3 Vols. W.H.D. Rouse. Cambridge, MA., Harvard University Press; London, William Heinemann, Ltd. 1940-1942. Greek text available at the Perseus Digital Library.
 Publius Papinius Statius, The Thebaid translated by John Henry Mozley. Loeb Classical Library Volumes. Cambridge, MA, Harvard University Press; London, William Heinemann Ltd. 1928. Online version at the Topos Text Project.
 Publius Papinius Statius, The Thebaid. Vol I-II. John Henry Mozley. London: William Heinemann; New York: G.P. Putnam's Sons. 1928. Latin text available at the Perseus Digital Library.

Maenads
Companions of Dionysus
Women in Greek mythology